Thecaphora oxalidis is a species of fungus belonging to the family Glomosporiaceae.

Synonym:
 Kochmania oxalidis (Ellis & Tracy) Piatek, 2005

References

Ustilaginomycotina